A Darker Shade of Evil is an EP by the Norwegian black metal band Fleurety.

This album was later included in Min Tid Skal Komme (Reissue) a re-issued version of Min Tid Skal Komme.

Track listing
"Profanations Beneath The Bleeding Stars" – 5:02
"...And the Choirs Behind Him" – 1:27
"My Resurrection in Eternal Hate" – 4:46

Credits
Alexander Nordgaren – Guitar, Bass, Lead Vocals
Svein Egil Hatlevik – Drums, Synthesizer, Backing Vocals

References

1994 EPs
Fleurety albums